Astacoides madagascarensis is a species of southern crawfish in the family Parastacidae.

The IUCN conservation status of Astacoides madagascarensis is "LC", least concern, with no immediate threat to the species' survival. The IUCN status was reviewed in 2016.

References

Further reading

 
 

Parastacidae
Articles created by Qbugbot
Crustaceans described in 1839